The Island Fringe Festival is an independent arts and theatre festival that takes place annually in Charlottetown, Prince Edward Island.  The Festival was founded by Sarah Segal-Lazar and Megan Stewart in 2012 with the first festival taking place in August of that year. The festival is one of three Fringe Festivals in Atlantic Canada and is a member of the Canadian Association of Fringe Festivals.

Shows and Venues

Fringe Performances take place around the city of Charlottetown in conventional and unconventional spaces, such as in homes, on patios, and in bars.  All shows in the festival are by donation, with proceeds going directly to artists. In August 2016, comedian Lorne Elliott debuted his new work, A Better Play Than Hamlet, at the Island Fringe.

References

External links
 

Theatre festivals in Prince Edward Island
Fringe festivals in Canada
Festivals in Charlottetown
Festivals established in 2012
2012 establishments in Prince Edward Island